Mak Mandin is an industrial town located in Butterworth, Penang, Malaysia. There are Chinese, Tamil and National schools, a police station and also a post office.

Economy
 Chee Wah Corporation Berhad

References 

 news story proving existence

Towns in Penang